Mitsuru Yūki is a female Japanese novelist who is famed for her work, Shōnen Onmyōji.
It is currently serialized in Kadokawa Shoten's The Beans and Beans Ace.

Works
Takamura Hagen Zōshi - 7 volumes
Shōnen Onmyōji - 47 volumes (currently)

Appearances

Radio
Shōnen Onmyōji - episode 2, 79 and 114

External links
Official Website
Mitsuru's Diary
List of works by the author

Japanese writers
Living people
Year of birth missing (living people)